Crazyhorse is an American magazine that publishes fiction, poetry, and essays. Since 1960, Crazyhorse has published many of the finest voices in literature, including John Updike, Raymond Carver, Jorie Graham, John Ashbery, Robert Bly, Ha Jin, Lee K. Abbott, Philip F. Deaver, Stacie Cassarino, W. P. Kinsella, Richard Wilbur, James Wright, Carolyn Forché, Charles Simic, Charles Wright, Billy Collins, Galway Kinnell, James Tate, and Franz Wright.

In 1987, Library Journal ranked Crazyhorse among the top twenty magazines that publish poetry in the United States. In 1990, Writer's Digest named it one of the fifty most influential magazines publishing fiction.

The magazine also sponsors the Lynda Hull Memorial Poetry Prize and the Crazyhorse Fiction Prize, awarding $2,000 and publication for a single piece of writing in each genre. Past fiction prize judges have included Joyce Carol Oates, Jaimy Gordon, Ann Patchett, Ha Jin, and Charles Baxter, and past poetry prize judges have included Carl Phillips, Billy Collins, Marvin Bell, and Mary Ruefle.

Crazyhorse is published twice yearly by the Department of English and the School of Humanities and Social Sciences at the College of Charleston in Charleston, South Carolina. The current editors are Bret Lott (non-fiction), Emily Rosko (poetry), Anthony Varallo (fiction), and managing editor Jonathan Bohr Heinen.

History
Crazy Horse was founded by poet Thomas McGrath in Los Angeles in 1960, and he served as the managing editor for the early years of the journal's publication. During the 1970s, the journal was helmed by several editors, including Deb and Edith Wylder who brought the journal to Murray State University in Kentucky. This was a time of great change for the new, single-named journal (Crazyhorse), and in addition to its original emphasis on poetry, the editors began to publish short fiction and critical essays. By the late 70s, Jorie Graham and James Galvin had become the journal's poetry editors, Joe Ashby Porter the fiction editor, and the journal had become known as one of the most respected in the country.

In 1981, Crazyhorse moved to the University of Arkansas at Little Rock, where it would stay until 2001. David Wojahn served as the poetry editor until 1986, when he was replaced by Ralph Burns, but he eventually returned after a two-year absence to work alongside poetry co-editors Lynda Hull and Dean Young. During this time, David Jauss served as fiction editor and Dennis Vannatta as criticism editor.

In 2001, after having served as sole editor of the journal for several years, Ralph Burns, through mutual friend Jauss, contacted Bret Lott at the College of Charleston to see if the College would be interested in taking over the journal due to its financial troubles at the University of Arkansas. The journal found a new home in Charleston, where its reputation as a first-class venue of new writing continues to grow. Currently, the journal is edited by the College of Charleston Creative Writing faculty, and its work has been reprinted in the Best American Poetry, Best American Short Stories, Best American Nonrequired Reading, and Pushcart Prize annual anthologies.

Name Change
From 1960 to 2022 the magazine published under the name Crazy Horse after Lakota chief Crazy Horse. In 2022 the editors of the magazine issued a statement condemning the name as an act of exploitation as the magazine was unaffiliated with the Lakota people. They announced that in 2023 the magazine would be rebranding as swamp pink after a form of lily native to the Carolinas where the magazine is currently located.

See also
List of literary magazines

References

External links 
 Crazyhorse website

Poetry magazines published in the United States
Biannual magazines published in the United States
Magazines established in 1960
Magazines published in California
Magazines published in Arkansas
College of Charleston
Magazines published in South Carolina
Mass media in Charleston, South Carolina